This is a list of all counties and municipalities (municipios in Spanish) that are directly on the Mexico–United States border. A total of 37 municipalities and 23 counties, spread across 6 Mexican and 4 American states, are located on the border. All entities are listed geographically from west to east.

Mexico

Baja California
 Tijuana Municipality
 Tecate Municipality
 Mexicali Municipality

Sonora
 San Luis Río Colorado Municipality
 Puerto Peñasco Municipality
 Plutarco Elías Calles Municipality
 Caborca Municipality
 Altar Municipality
 Sáric Municipality
 Nogales Municipality
 Santa Cruz Municipality
 Cananea Municipality
 Naco Municipality
 Agua Prieta Municipality

Chihuahua
 Janos Municipality
 Ascensión Municipality
 Juárez Municipality
 Guadalupe Municipality (first occurrence)
 Práxedis G. Guerrero Municipality
 Guadalupe Municipality (second occurrence, since it borders Práxedis G. Guerrero on three sides)
 Ojinaga Municipality
 Manuel Benavides Municipality

Coahuila
 Ocampo Municipality
 Acuña Municipality
 Jiménez Municipality
 Piedras Negras Municipality
 Guerrero Municipality
 Hidalgo Municipality

Nuevo León
 Anohuac Municipality

Tamaulipas
 Nuevo Laredo Municipality
 Guerrero Municipality
 Mier Municipality
 Miguel Alemán Municipality
 Camargo Municipality
 Gustavo Díaz Ordaz Municipality
 Reynosa Municipality
 Río Bravo Municipality
 Matamoros Municipality

United States

California
 San Diego County
 Imperial County

Arizona
 Yuma County
 Pima County
 Santa Cruz County
 Cochise County

New Mexico
 Hidalgo County
 Luna County
 Doña Ana County

Texas
 El Paso County
 Hudspeth County
 Jeff Davis County (border at only one point, i.e., border length is zero)
 Presidio County
 Brewster County
 Terrell County
 Val Verde County
 Kinney County
 Maverick County
 Webb County
 Zapata County
 Starr County
 Hidalgo County
 Cameron County

See also
 International border states of the United States#Border with Mexico

Municipalities of Mexico
Mexico